The small brown crow (Euploea darchia) is a butterfly found in Australia that belongs to the crows and tigers, that is, the danaid group of the brush-footed butterflies family.

External links
"Euploea Fabricius, 1807" at Markku Savela's Lepidoptera and Some Other Life Forms

Euploea